A roof tent or rooftop tent is an accessory which may be fitted to the roof or bed of a motor vehicle which allows the users to sleep in relative safety and comfort above the vehicle, and leaves the internal load-space free. The first example of roof-tents appeared in Western Europe in the 1930s.

Roof tents are particularly seen on expedition-prepared four wheel drive vehicles such as Land Rovers, but can be fitted to almost any vehicle. Generally they will mount to a vehicles roof rack or aftermarket roof bars. They are particularly popular in Italy and one manufacturer advertises them using photographs of their devices fitted to cars as small as the Fiat Panda.

History

Designs and styles
Roof tents have traditionally taken the form of a conventional ridge-pole tent which can be folded into a compact package, resting on marine plywood, and mounted on a roof rack. Beginning in 1958, more modern tent designs appeared - housed in a waterproof, moulded fiberglass or carbon fibre box, and are erected and taken down more quickly using a simple crank-operated cantilever arrangement or gas rams that automatically erect the tent when the latches are released. In 2003 a French manufacturer introduced another design of simple and lightweight tents, resembling modern sprung-pole types of ground tent.

Manufacturers 
 James Baroud
 NaïtUp

See also
 Autohome
 Camping
 Off-roading
 Overlanding

References

Tents
Automotive accessories

eu:Kanpin